Io vagabondo is an Italian song by the Italian band I Nomadi, written in 1972.

It sold millions of copies and is still performed by I Nomadi at their concerts.

Spanish version 
There is a Spanish version call Yo vagabundo; it was written in 1973 but it was published on CD only in 2003.

1972 singles
Italian songs